Amruta Deshmukh is an Indian television actress. She made her television debut with Tumcha Aamcha Same Asta serial on Star Pravah. She is known for her performance in Freshers as Pari. Currently, she has participated in Bigg Boss Marathi 4 as a contestant.

Early life 
She was born in Jalgaon, Maharashtra. She is younger sister of Marathi television actor Abhishek Deshmukh who played a role in Star Pravah's Aai Kuthe Kay Karte.

Career 

She graduated from the Ranade Institute of Mass Communication and Journalism, Pune. Due to cultural interest, she acted in a few theatres plays. She also participated in Miss Pune Festival. Then she started acting in television serials and short films. She is also a Radio jockey for 98.3 Mirchi Pune.

Filmography

Films

Television

References

External links
 

Living people
Indian film actresses
21st-century Indian actresses
Indian television actresses
Marathi actors
Actresses in Marathi cinema
Actresses in Marathi television
Bigg Boss Marathi contestants
Year of birth missing (living people)